Deadline is a fictional villain in the DC Comics universe. He first appears in the story "Deadline Doom!" in Starman #15 (October 1989) and was created by Roger Stern.

Fictional character biography
Deadline first appears as a mercenary with a contract on Starman Will Payton. He is mentioned to be one of the best and highest paid super-mercenaries, along with Bolt. Other stories suggest that, while Deadline is a master at what he does, he is not as highly regarded as, for example, Deathstroke or Deadshot.

Deadline appears as a vacationer in Bialya after it is opened up to supervillains. When the country is assisted by the Justice League, Deadline is captured by Guy Gardner.

Deadline later becomes part of a more villainous version of the Suicide Squad propping up the dictatorship in the Bermuda Triangle island of Diabloverde. His team is shown terrorizing civilians for fun. Amanda Waller and her Squad take him out, along with his colleagues, while attempting to remove the dictator.

During the Underworld Unleashed crossover event, Deadline meets fellow mercenaries Deadshot, Merlyn the Dark Archer, Bolt, and Chiller, and bands together with them as the Killer Elite. While operating within this group, they confront the mercenaries called the Body Doubles. The entire Elite suffers multiple humiliating defeats.

He is hired by King Theisley of Poseidonis to assassinate Aquaman. Despite managing to get Aquaman out of the seas and into the sky, he fails to kill him. He also attempts to kill Steel at one point but fails that as well.

Deadline is shot and apparently killed by Warden Wolfe at Iron Heights prison while trying to escape with cohorts Deadshot and Merlyn.

He later appears alive in the 2004 Deadshot miniseries. Writer Christos Gage justified this by pointing out that, at the time of the shooting, Deadline had been dosed with Joker venom, which has been established as having healing properties. He later appears in Cry for Justice.

DC Rebirth
In the DC Rebirth reboot, a refined, uncostumed Deadline appears in Deathstroke (vol. 4) #15 with his hover discs. Deadline clashed with Deathstroke when the former was hired to kill congresswoman Delores Hasgrove, and the latter accompanied the hero Powergirl, who protected her. Their initial clash began when Deadline seemingly killed Tanya with his infinity rifle, and only ended with Deathstroke severing Deadline's right hand and stealing his signature weapon when the assassin attempted to phase it through the former's Ikon Suit.

Deadline later appears as a member of the Secret Society of Super Villains.

Powers and abilities
Deadline has the inherent power of intangibility with a unique twist. He is able turn himself and any equipment that he is carrying intangible while still able to physically interact with his gear or his adversaries. He wears special equipment, including golden battle armor, a plasma gun and flying discs.

References

External links
 Deadline at DC Comics Wiki
 Deadline at Comic Vine

DC Comics supervillains
Fictional characters who can turn intangible
Comics characters introduced in 1989
Characters created by Roger Stern
DC Comics metahumans